The 1869 Dumfriesshire by-election was fought on 31 March 1869.  The by-election was fought due to the disqualification of the incumbent MP of the Liberal Party, Sydney Waterlow, as he was deemed to be a government contractor.  It was won by the Conservative candidate George Gustavus Walker.

References

Politics of Dumfries and Galloway
1869 elections in the United Kingdom
1869 in Scotland
1860s elections in Scotland
By-elections to the Parliament of the United Kingdom in Scottish constituencies
March 1869 events